Polyinosinic:polycytidylic acid (usually abbreviated poly I:C or poly(I:C)) is an immunostimulant. It is used in the form of its sodium salt to simulate viral infections.

Poly I:C is known to interact with toll-like receptor 3 (TLR3), which is expressed at the endosomal membrane of B-cells, macrophages and dendritic cells. Poly I:C is structurally similar to double-stranded RNA, which is present in some viruses and is a "natural" stimulant of TLR3. Thus, Poly I:C can be considered a synthetic analog of double-stranded RNA and is a common tool for scientific research on the immune system.

Chemistry
Poly I:C is a mismatched double-stranded RNA with one strand being a polymer of inosinic acid, the other a polymer of cytidylic acid.

Variants
Optimization of physicochemical properties of poly I:C has led to generation of derivatives that have increased stability in body fluids (such as polyICLC), or reduced toxicity through reduced stability in body fluids (such as poly I:C12U).

References

Immunostimulants
TLR3 agonist